Metacanthus multispinus is a species of stilt bug in the family Berytidae. It is found in the Caribbean Sea, Central America, North America, and South America.

References

Berytidae
Articles created by Qbugbot
Insects described in 1887